Bagh-e Now (also Romanized as Bāgh-e Now) is a village in Hangam Rural District, in the Central District of Qir and Karzin County, Fars Province, Iran. At the 2006 census, its population was 430, in 77 families.

References 

Populated places in Qir and Karzin County